Mr Simms Olde Sweet Shoppe is a store chain which offers a range of boiled sweet products in Victorian-style stores. Officially opening in September 2004, there are now over 80 stores open worldwide . In recent years, stores have opened up in Asia including three in Hong Kong, where the company's flagship international store opened in 2014.

References

British companies established in 2004
Food and drink companies of England